French Touch is the fifth studio album by Italian-French singer Carla Bruni, released on 6 October 2017 by Teorema and Barclay.

Track listing
"Enjoy the Silence" – 3:14
"Jimmy Jazz" – 2:30
"Love Letters" – 2:27
"Miss You" – 3:31
"The Winner Takes It All" – 3:31
"Crazy" (featuring Willie Nelson) – 3:03
"Highway to Hell" – 3:25
"Perfect Day" – 2:58
"Stand by Your Man" – 2:43
"Please Don't Kiss Me" – 3:34
"Moon River" – 3:14

DVD: Live Session at Studios St Germain, Paris
"Enjoy the Silence"		
"Jimmy Jazz"		
"Miss You"		
"The Winner Takes It All"		
"Crazy"		
"Enjoy the Silence" (music video)		
"Miss You" (music video)

Charts

Weekly charts

Year-end charts

Certifications

References

2013 albums
Albums produced by David Foster
Barclay (record label) albums
Carla Bruni albums
Covers albums